The 1967–68 UC Irvine Anteaters men's basketball team represented the University of California, Irvine during the 1967–68 NCAA College Division men's basketball season. The Anteaters were led by first year head coach Dick Davis and played their home games at Campus Hall. The anteaters finished the season with a record of 20–8.

Previous season
The 1966–67 Anteaters finished with a record of 15–11 under second year coach Danny Rogers. Danny Rogers resigned at the end of the season and frosh coach Dick Davis was promoted to the position of head coach.

Roster

Schedule

|-
!colspan=9 style=|Regular season

|-
!colspan=12 style="background:#;"| NCAA Tournament

Source

References

UC Irvine Anteaters men's basketball seasons
UC Irvine Anteaters
UC Irvine Anteaters